Detlef Bothe (born 9 December 1957) is an East German sprint canoer who competed in the mid-1970s. At the 1976 Summer Olympics in Montreal, he finished fifth in the C-2 1000 m event while being eliminated in the semifinals of the C-2 500 m event.

References
Sports-reference.com profile

1957 births
Canoeists at the 1976 Summer Olympics
German male canoeists
Living people
Olympic canoeists of East Germany